Aldersladum nana is a species of the genus Aldersladum.

References 

Alcyoniidae
Aquatic organisms
Animals described in 1931